The Swartz Prize for Theoretical and Computational Neuroscience, established in 2008, is an annual award supported by the Swartz Foundation and administered by the Society for Neuroscience. The award "honors an individual whose activities have produced a significant cumulative contribution to theoretical models or computational methods in neuroscience or who has made a particularly noteworthy recent advance in theoretical or computational neuroscience." The winner receives a cash prize of US$25000 and expenses to attend the Society for Neuroscience annual meeting.

Awardees 
Source: Society for Neuroscience

 2008: Wilfrid Rall
 2009: Horace Barlow
 2010: Larry Abbott
 2011: Haim Sompolinsky
 2012: John J. Hopfield
 2013: William S. Bialek
 2014: Tomaso Poggio
 2015: Terry Sejnowski
 2016: Nancy Kopell
 2017: 
 2018: Kenneth D. Miller
 2019: John Rinzel
 2020: Emery N. Brown
 2022: Ila R. Fiete

See also

 List of neuroscience awards

References

External links 
 Swartz Prize for Theoretical and Computational Neuroscience - Society for Neuroscience. Info and winner list.

Neuroscience awards
American science and technology awards